Chan-soo Kim (born 17 February 2001) is a South Korean footballer who plays as a midfielder.

Club career

MFK Tatran Liptovský Mikuláš
Kim made his professional debut for MFK Tatran Liptovský Mikuláš against ŠK Slovan Bratislava on 24 July 2021.

References

External links
 MFK Tatran Liptovský Mikuláš official club profile 
 
 
 Futbalnet profile 

2001 births
Living people
South Korean footballers
Association football midfielders
MFK Tatran Liptovský Mikuláš players
2. Liga (Slovakia) players
Slovak Super Liga players
People from Ansan
South Korean expatriate footballers
South Korean expatriate sportspeople in Slovakia
Expatriate footballers in Slovakia
Sportspeople from Gyeonggi Province